Squad numbers are used in association football to identify and distinguish players that are on the field. Numbers very soon became a way to also indicate position, with starting players being assigned numbers 1–11, although in the modern game they are often influenced by the players' favourite numbers and other less technical reasons, as well as using "surrogates" for a number that is already in use. However, numbers 1–11 are often still worn by players of the previously associated position.

As national leagues adopted squad numbers and game tactics evolved over the decades, numbering systems evolved separately in each football scene, and so different countries have different conventions. Still, there are some numbers that are universally agreed upon being used for a particular position, because they are quintessentially associated with that role.

For instance, "1" is frequently used by the starting goalkeeper, as the goalkeeper is the first player in a line-up. It is also the only position on the field that is required to be occupied. "9" is usually worn by strikers, also known as centre-forwards, who hold the most advanced offensive position on the pitch, and are often the highest scorers in the team. "10" is one of the most emblematic squad numbers in football, due to the sheer number of football legends that have worn the number 10 shirt; playmakers, second strikers, and attacking midfielders have worn this number.

History

First use of numbers

The first record of numbered jerseys in football date back to 1911, with Australian teams Sydney Leichardt and HMS Powerful being the first to use squad numbers on their backs. One year later, numbering in football would be ruled as mandatory in New South Wales.

The next recorded use was on 23 March 1914, when the English Wanderers, a team of amateur players from Football League clubs, played Corinthians at Stamford Bridge, London. This was Corinthians first match after their FA ban for joining the Amateur Football Association was rescinded. Wanderers won 4–2.

In South America, Argentina was the first country with numbered shirts. It was during the Scottish team Third Lanark tour to South America of 1923, they played a friendly match v a local combined team ("Zona Norte") on 10 June. Both squads were numbered from 1–11.

On 30 March 1924, saw the first football match in the United States with squad numbers, when the Fall River Marksmen played St. Louis Vesper Buick during the 1923–24 National Challenge Cup, although only the local team wore numbered shirts.

The next recorded use in association football in Europe was on 25 August 1928 when The Wednesday played Arsenal and Chelsea hosted Swansea Town at Stamford Bridge. Numbers were assigned by field location:

Goalkeeper
Right full back (right side centre back)
Left full back (left side centre back)
Right half back (right side defensive midfield)
Centre half back (centre defensive midfield)
Left half back (left side defensive midfield)
Outside right (right winger)
Inside right (attacking midfield)
Centre forward
Inside left (attacking midfield)
Outside left (left winger)

In the first game at Stamford Bridge, only the outfield players wore numbers (2–11). The Daily Express (p. 13, 27 August 1928) reported, "The 35,000 spectators were able to give credit for each bit of good work to the correct individual, because the team were numbered, and the large figures in black on white squares enabled each man to be identified without trouble." The Daily Mirror ("Numbered Jerseys A Success", p. 29, 27 August 1928) also covered the match: "I fancy the scheme has come to stay. All that was required was a lead and London has supplied it." When Chelsea toured Argentina, Uruguay and Brazil at the end of the season in the summer of 1929, they also wore numbered shirts, earning the nickname "Los Numerados" ("the numbered") from locals.

A similar numbering criteria was used in the 1933 FA Cup Final between Everton and Manchester City. Nevertheless, it was not until the 1939–40 season when The Football League ruled that squads had to wear numbers for each player.

Early evolutions of formations involved moving specific positions; for example, moving the centre half back to become a defender rather than a half back. Their numbers went with them, hence central defenders wearing number 5, and remnants of the system remain. For example, in friendly and championship qualifying matches England, when playing the 4–4–2 formation, generally number their players (using the standard right to left system of listing football teams) four defenders – 2, 5, 6, 3; four midfielders – 7, 4, 8, 11; two forwards – 10, 9. This system of numbering can also be adapted to a midfield diamond with the holding midfielder wearing 4 and the attacking central midfielder wearing 8. Similarly the Swedish national team number their players: four defenders – 2, 3, 4, 5; four midfielders – 7, 6, 8, 9; two forwards – 10, 11.

The 1950 FIFA World Cup was the first FIFA competition to see squad numbers for each players, but persistent numbers would not be issued until the 1954 World Cup, where each man in a country's 22-man squad wore a specific number from 1 to 22 for the duration of the tournament.

Evolution
In 1993, The Football Association (The FA) switched to persistent squad numbers, abandoning the mandatory use of 1–11 for the starting line-up. The first league event to feature this was the 1993 Football League Cup Final between Arsenal and Sheffield Wednesday, and it became standard in the FA Premier League the following season, along with names printed above the numbers. Charlton Athletic were among the ten Football League clubs who chose to adopt squad numbers for the 1993–94 season (with squad numbers assigned to players in alphabetical order according to their surname), before reverting to 1–11 shirt numbering a year later.

Squad numbers became optional in the three divisions of The Football League at the same time, but only 10 out of 70 clubs used them. One of those clubs, Brighton & Hove Albion, issued 25 players with squad numbers but reverted to traditional 1–11 numbering halfway through the season. In the Premier League, Arsenal temporarily reverted to the old system halfway through that same season, but reverted to the new numbering system for the following campaign. Most European top leagues adopted the system during the 1990s. The Football League made squad numbers compulsory for the 1999–2000 season, and the Football Conference followed suit for the 2002–03 season.

The traditional 1–11 numbers have been worn on occasions by English clubs since their respective leagues introduced squad numbers. Premier League clubs often used the traditional squad numbering system when competing in domestic or European cups, often when their opponents still made use of the traditional squad numbering system. This included Manchester United's Premier League clash with Manchester City at Old Trafford on 10 February 2008, when 1950s style kits were worn as part of the Munich air disaster's 50th anniversary commemorations.

Players may now wear any number (as long as it is unique within their squad) between 1 and 99.

In continental Western Europe this can generally be seen:

1– Goalkeeper

2– Right Back

3– Left Back

4– Centre Back

5– Centre Back (or Sweeper, if used)

6– Central Defensive/Holding Midfielder

7– Right Attacking Midfielders/Wingers

8– Central/Box-to-Box Midfielder

9– Striker

10– Attacking Midfielder/Playmaker

11– Left Attacking Midfielders/Wingers

This changes from formation to formation, however the defensive number placement generally remain the same. The use of inverted wingers now sees traditional right wingers, the number 7's, like Cristiano Ronaldo, on the left, and traditional left wingers, the number 11's, like Gareth Bale, on the right.

Numbering by country

Argentina

Argentina developed its numeration system independently from the rest of the world. This was because until the 1960s, Argentine football developed more or less isolated from the evolution brought by English, Italian and Hungarian coaches, owing to technological limitations at the time in communications and travelling with Europe, lack of information as to keeping up with news, lack of awareness and/or interest in the latest innovations, and strong nationalism promoted by the Asociación del Fútbol Argentino (for example, back then Argentines playing in Europe were banned from playing in the Argentine national team).

The first formation used in Argentine football was the 2–3–5 and, until the '60s, it was the sole formation employed by Argentine clubs and the Argentina national football team, with only very few exceptions like River Plate's La Máquina from the '40s that used 3–2–2–3. It was not until the mid 1960s in the national team, with Argentina winning the Taça das Nações (1964) using 3–2–5, and the late '60s, for clubs, with Estudiantes winning the treble of the Copa Libertadores (1968, 1969, 1970) using 4–4–2, that Argentine football finally adopted modern formations on major scale, and caught up with its counterparts on the other side of the Atlantic.

While the original 2–3–5 formation used the same numbering system dictated by the English clubs in 1928, subsequent changes were developed independently.

The basic formation to understand the Argentine numeration system is the 4–3–3 formation, like the one used by the coach César Menotti that made Argentina win the 1978 World Cup, the squad numbers employed are:

 1 Goalkeeper
 4 Right Back
 2 First Centre Back / Sweeper
 6 Second Centre Back / Stopper
 3 Left Back
 8 Right Midfielder
 5 Central Defensive Midfielder
 10 Left Midfielder
 7 Right Winger
 11 Left Winger
 9 Striker

Brazil 

In Brazil, the 4–2–4 formation was developed independently from Europe, thus leading to a different numbering – here shown in the 4–3–3 formation to stress that in Brazil, number ten is midfield:

1 Goleiro (Goalkeeper)
2 Lateral Direito (right wingback)
3 Beque Central (centre back)
4 Quarto Zagueiro (the "fourth defender", almost the same as a centre back)
6 Lateral Esquerdo (left wingback)
5 Volante ("Rudder" or "mobile", the defensive midfielder)
8 Meia Direita (right midfielder)
10 Meia Esquerda (left midfielder, generally more offensive than the right one)
7 Ponta Direita (right winger)
9 Centro-Avante (centre-forward)
11 Ponta Esquerda (left winger)

When in 4–2–4, number 10 passes to the Ponta de Lança (striker), and 4–4–2 formations get this configuration: four defenders – 2 (right wingback), 4, 3, 6 (left wingback); four midfielders – 5 (defensive), 8 ("second midfielder"), similar to a central midfielder), 7, 10 (attacking); two strikers – 9, 11

France
In France, players must be registered between numbers 1–30, with 1 and 16 reserved for goalkeepers and 33 left empty for extra signings. In case a fourth goalkeeper has to be registered, he wears number 40.

Hungary 
In Eastern Europe, the defence numbering is slightly different. The Hungarian national team under Gusztáv Sebes switched from a 2–3–5 formation to 3–2–5. So the defence numbers were 2 to 4 from right to left thus making the right back (2), centre back (3) and the left back (4). Since the concept of a flat back four the number (5) has become the other centre back.

Italy
In 1995, the Italian Football Federation (FIGC) also switched to persistent squad numbers for Serie A and Serie B (second division), abandoning the mandatory use of 1–11 for the starting lineup. After some years during which players had to wear a number between 1–24, now they can wear any number between 1–99 without restrictions. Notably, Chievo Verona had the goalkeeper Cristiano Lupatelli wearing number 10 from 2001 to 2003 and midfielder Jonathan de Guzman wearing number 1 in 2016.

Spain
In the Spanish La Liga, players in the A-squad (maximum 25 players, including a maximum of three goalkeepers) must wear a number between 1–25. Goalkeepers must wear either 1, 13 or 25. When players from the reserve team are selected to play for the first team, they are given squad numbers between 26 and 50.

United Kingdom

Players are not generally allowed to change their number during a season, although a player may change number if they change clubs mid-season. Players may change squad numbers between seasons, this often happens when a player’s role in the first team increases or diminishes. Occasionally, when a player has two loan spells at the same club in a single season (or returns as a permanent signing after an earlier loan spell), an alternative squad number is needed if the original number assigned during the player's first loan spell has been reassigned by the time the player returns.

A move from a high number to a low one may be an indication that the player is likely to be a regular starter for the coming season, particularly after at least one preceding season of increased first team opportunities. An example of this is Celtic's Scott McDonald, who, after the departure of former number 7 Maciej Żurawski, was given the number, a move down from 27. Another example is Steven Gerrard, who wore number 28 (which was his academy number) during his debut 1998–99 season, then switched to number 17 in 2000–01. In 2004–05, after Emile Heskey left Liverpool, Gerrard then changed his number again to 8. More recently, Tottenham Hotspur striker Harry Kane changed his number 37 shirt from the 2013–14 season to 18 for the 2014–15 season when he became one of the club's first-choice strikers after Jermain Defoe was sold and the number 18 was vacated.  Kane then switched to the number 10 for the 2015–16 season after Emmanuel Adebayor left the club and the number was vacated. Manchester City's Sergio Agüero also did a similar switch in jersey number, from number 16 in 2014–15 to number 10 in 2015–16, a number he took over from Edin Džeko following his loan departure to Roma. During the 1990s, David Beckham wore a different shirt number for Manchester United during four consecutive seasons. He was assigned with the number 28 shirt for the 1993-94 season and retained it for the 1994-95 season, before switching to the number 24 shirt for the 1995-96 season, when he established himself as a regular player. He then switched to the number 10 shirt for the 1996-97 season, and following the retirement of Eric Cantona at the end of that season, he switched to the number 7 shirt for the 1997-98 season, with new signing Teddy Sheringham taking the number 10 shirt.

Some players keep the number they start their career at a club with, such as Chelsea defender John Terry, who wore the number 26 during his long spell at the club, rather than adopting a number 4, 5 or 6 shirt which he might have been expected to take on once he was established as a regular player. On occasion, players have moved numbers to accommodate a new player; for example, Chelsea midfielder Yossi Benayoun handed new signing Juan Mata the number 10 shirt, and changed to the number 30, which doubles his "lucky" number 15. Upon signing for Everton in 2007, Yakubu refused the prestigious number 9 shirt and asked to be assigned number 22, setting this number as a goal-scoring target for his first season, a feat he ultimately fell one goal short of achieving.

In a traditional 4–4–2 system in the UK, the squad numbers 1–11 would usually have been occupied in this manner:

 1 Goalkeeper
 2 Right back
 3 Left back
 4 Central midfielder (more defensive)
 5 Centre back
 6 Centre back
 7 Right winger
 8 Central midfielder (more attacking/Box-to-Box)
 9 Striker (usually a target player)
 10 Centre-forward (usually a fast poacher)
 11 Left winger

However, in a more modern 4–2–3–1 system, they will be arranged like this:

 1 Goalkeeper
 2 Right back
 3 Left back
 4 Central midfielder (more defensive)
 5 Centre back
 6 Centre back
 7 Right winger
 8 Central midfielder (box-to-box)
 9 Striker
 10 Central midfielder (more attacking)
 11 Left winger

Higher-level clubs have a tendency to field reserve and fringe players in the English Football League Cup as well as insignificant games near the end of the league campaign when there are no major issues (eg a league title, European place or promotion or relegation issues) to be decided, so high squad numbers are not uncommon. Nico Yennaris wore 64 for Arsenal in the competition on 26 September 2012 in a match against Coventry City and on 24 September 2014, again in the League Cup, Manchester City forward José Ángel Pozo wore the number 78 shirt in a match against Sheffield Wednesday. In a quarter-final tie on 17 December 2019, Liverpool player Tom Hill became the first player in English football history to wear the number 99 shirt in a competitive match. In The Football League, the number 55 has been worn by Ade Akinbiyi for Crystal Palace, and Dominik Werling for Barnsley.

When Sunderland signed Cameroonian striker Patrick Mboma on loan in 2002, he wanted the number 70 to symbolize his birth year of 1970. The Premier League refused, however, and he wore the number 7 instead.

England 

In England, in a now traditional 4–4–2 formation, the standard numbering is usually: 2 (right fullback), 5, 6, 3 (left fullback); 4 (defensive midfielder), 7 (right midfielder), 8 (central/attacking midfielder), 11 (left midfielder); 10 (second/support striker), 9 (striker). This came about based on the traditional 2–3–5 system. Where the 2 fullbacks retained the numbers 2, 3. Then of the halves, 4 was kept as the central defensive midfielder, while 5 and 6 were moved backward to be in the central of defence. 7 and 11 stayed as the wide attacking players, whilst 8 dropped back a little from inside forward to a (sometimes attacking) midfield role, and 10 stayed as a second striker in support of a number 9. The 4 is generally the holding midfielder, as through the formation evolution it was often used for the sweeper or libero position. This position defended behind the central defenders, but attacked in front – feeding the midfield. It is generally not used today, and developed into the holding midfielder role.

When substitutions were introduced to the game in 1965, the substitute typically took the number 12; when a second substitute was allowed, they wore 14. Players were not compelled to wear the number 13 if they were superstitious.

United States and Canada
North American professional association football club follows a model similar to that of European clubs, with the exception that many American and Canadian clubs do not have "reserve squads", and thus do not assign higher numbers to those players.

Most American and Canadian clubs have players numbered from 1 to 30, with higher numbers being reserved for second and third goalkeepers. In the United Soccer Leagues First Division and Major League Soccer (MLS), there were only 20 outfield players wearing squad numbers higher than 30 on the first team in the 2009 season, suggesting that the traditional model has been followed.

In 2007, MLS club LA Galaxy retired the former playing number of Cobi Jones, number 13, becoming the first MLS team to do so.

In 2011, MLS club Real Salt Lake retired the former playing number of coach Jason Kreis, number 9.

Goalkeeper numbering

The first-choice goalkeeper is usually assigned the number 1 shirt as he or she is the first player in a line-up.

The second-choice goalkeeper wears, on many occasions, shirt number 12 which is the first shirt of the second line up, or number 13. In the past, when it was permitted to assign five substitute players in a match, the goalkeeper would also often wear the number 16, the last shirt number in the squad. Later on, when association football laws changed and it was permitted to assign seven substitute players, second-choice goalkeepers often wore the number 18. In the A-League, second-choice goalkeepers mostly wear number 20, based on that competition having a 20-man regulated "first team" squad size.

In international tournaments (such as FIFA World Cup or continental cups) each team must list a squad of 23 players, wearing shirts numbered 1 through 23. Thus, in this case, third-choice goalkeepers often wear the number 23. Prior to the 2002 FIFA World Cup, only 22 players were permitted in international squads; therefore, the third goalkeeper was often awarded the number 22 jersey in previous tournaments.

The move to a fixed number being assigned to each player in a squad was initiated for the 1954 World Cup where each man in a country's 22-man squad wore a specific number for the duration of the tournament. As a result, the numbers 12 to 22 were assigned to different squad players, with no resemblance to their on-field positions. This meant that a team could start a match not necessarily fielding players wearing numbers one to eleven. Although the numbers one to eleven tended to be given to those players deemed to be the "first choice line-up", this was not always the case for a variety of reasons – a famous example was Johan Cruyff, who insisted on wearing the number 14 shirt for the Netherlands.

In the 1958 World Cup, the Brazilian Football Confederation forgot to send the player numbers list to the event organization. However, the Uruguayan official Lorenzo Villizzio assigned random numbers to the players. The goalkeeper Gilmar received the number 3, and Garrincha and Zagallo wore opposite winger numbers, 11 and 7, while Pelé was randomly given the number 10, for which he would become famous.

Argentina defied convention by numbering their squads for the 1978, 1982 and 1986 World Cups alphabetically, resulting in outfield players (not goalkeepers) wearing the number 1 shirt (although Diego Maradona was given an out-of-sequence number 10 in both 1982 and 1986 while Mario Kempes in 1982 and Jorge Valdano in 1986 were allowed to use number 11). In 1974 Argentina also used the alphabetical system, but only to line players and goalkeepers Daniel Carnevali and Ubaldo Fillol wore traditional goalkeeping numbers 1 and 12 respectively. England used a similar alphabetical scheme for the 1982 World Cup, but retained the traditional numbers for the goalkeepers (1, 13 and 22) and the team captain (7), Kevin Keegan. In the 1990 World Cup, Scotland assigned squad numbers according to the number of international matches each player had played at the time (with the exception of goalkeeper Jim Leighton, who was assigned an out-of-sequence number 1): Alex McLeish, who was the most capped player, wore number 2, whereas Robert Fleck and Bryan Gunn, who only had one cap each, wore numbers 21 and 22, respectively. In a practice that ended after the 1998 World Cup, Italy gave low squad numbers to defenders, medium to midfielders, and high ones to forwards, while numbers 1, 12 and 22 were assigned to goalkeepers. In July 2007, a FIFA document issuing regulations for the 2010 World Cup finally stated that the number 1 jersey must be issued to a goalkeeper.

Before the 2002 World Cup, the Argentine Football Association (AFA) attempted to retire the number 10 in honour of Maradona by submitting a squad list of 23 players for the tournament, listed 1 through 24, with the number 10 omitted. FIFA rejected Argentina's plan, with the governing body's president Sepp Blatter suggesting the number 10 shirt be instead given to the team's third-choice goalkeeper, Roberto Bonano. The AFA ultimately submitted a revised list with Ariel Ortega, originally listed as number 23, as the number 10.

In early era of Chinese football, number 0 was often assigned to a substitute goalkeeper. At least 4 goalkeepers had been recorded wearing number 0 on field during the early years of professional league of China: Zhao Lei from Sichuan Quanxing, Wang Zhenjie from August 1, Li Jiming from Tianjin Lifei and Li Yun from Shanghai Yuyuan.

Unusual or notable numbers
Hicham Zerouali was allowed to wear the number 0 for Scottish Premier League club Aberdeen after the fans nicknamed him "Zero".
Outfield players have occasionally worn the number 1 for their clubs, including Pantelis Kafes for Olympiacos and AEK Athens, Charlton Athletic's Stuart Balmer in the 1990s, Sliema Wanderers' David Carabkott in 2005–06, Partizan's Simon Vukčević in 2004–05, Beşiktaş's Daniel Pancu in 2005–06, Atlético Mineiro's Diego Souza in 2010 and Barnet player-manager Edgar Davids in 2013–14.
Also in 2001, Argentinian goalkeeper Sergio Vargas wore number 188 for Universidad de Chile, as part of a commercial agreement with telecommunications brand Telefónica CTC Chile. However, the number was not allowed in international competitions, in which Vargas was forced to wear number 1.
Italian goalkeeper Cristiano Lupatelli wore number 10 while playing for Chievo Verona, between 2001 and 2003. Lupatelli himself admitted that he did it just for fun and due to a bet he made with his friends.
In 2004, Porto goalkeeper Vítor Baía became the first player to wear 99 in the final of a major European competition, donning the kit in the 2004 UEFA Champions League Final.
During the 1990s and early 2000s, number 58 was somewhat common among players based in or native to western Mexico, especially the city of Guadalajara. It started as a publicity stunt by radio station XEAV-AM (580 AM), branded as Canal 58. Some notable players to use number 58 were Jared Borgetti, Juan Pablo Rodríguez, Carlos Turrubiates, Eric Wynalda, Hugo Norberto Castillo, Darío Franco, Carlos María Morales, Osmar Donizete, and Benjamín Galindo.
Chilean striker Marco Olea wore number 111 for Universidad de Chile during the 2005 season. Originally wearing number 11, he decided to give his number to Marcelo Salas upon his arrival to the club.
Parma goalkeeper Luca Bucci wore the numbers 7 (2005–06) and 5 (2006–07 and 2007–08).
Iván Zamorano wore number "1+8", or number 18 with a plus symbol between the two digits, for Internazionale from 1997 to 2000, after his number 9 was given to Ronaldo.
Derek Riordan was given squad number 01 by Hibernian in the 2008–09 season. Number 10 had already been taken by Colin Nish, and none of the club's goalkeepers had been allocated number 1.
In 2008, Milan's three new signings each chose a number indicating the year of his birth: 76 (Andriy Shevchenko, born 1976), 80 (Ronaldinho, born 1980) and 84 (Mathieu Flamini, born 1984).
 The Asian Football Confederation (AFC) once required players to keep the same squad numbers throughout the qualification rounds for the AFC Asian Cup, resulting in players with squad numbers of 100 or higher, most notably the number 121 worn by Thomas Oar of Australia in the 2011 AFC Asian Cup qualifier match against Indonesia.
 Gary Hooper wore shirt number 88 at Celtic as his number 10 was already taken and 88 is the year (1988) he was born in. "88" (1888) is also the year Celtic was founded. The season after Hooper signed, new signing Victor Wanyama chose the number 67 to honour the Lisbon Lions, Celtic's European Cup winning team of 1967.
Mexican goalkeeper Guillermo Ochoa wore the number 8 shirt for Standard Liège in his first season at the club. His last name (Ochoa) is similar to the Spanish word for "8" (ocho). He also wore the number 6 in his second stint for Club America in his first season at the club, as his traditional number 13 was taken by Leonel López. He chose the number 6 because that was the date his niece was born, and it was the day he signed for Club America.
When Róger Guedes signed for Sport Club Corinthians Paulista, he chose the number 123. He chose this because the numbers go 1, 2, 3..., because he has been wearing 23 for years and now that he has a son he wants to begin a new chapter of his life, which includes a new number, but still wants to retain some connection, and also because Fagner Conserva Lemos was already wearing the 23. On substitution boards, it will show 12 or 23 and someone will tell Guedes that he is going on/off.
When Andrés Iniesta left FC Barcelona in 2018, a special "#Infinit8Iniesta" shirt was released. Although Iniesta never wore it in a match, it was sold to fans. The number on the back, instead of 8, was an infinity symbol (∞).

Commemorative numbers

Jesús Arellano, when playing for Club de Futbol Monterrey, wore the number 400 in 1996 to celebrate the city's 400th anniversary.
Brazilian Goiás goalkeeper Harlei wore number 400 in a match in 2006, to celebrate his 400th match for the team.
Brazilian Santos goalkeeper Fábio Costa wore number 300 in a match in 2008 to celebrate his 300th match for the team.
Andreas Herzog wore the number 100 on his 100th match for the Austrian national team, a friendly against Norway, as he was the first Austrian player to have 100 caps.
James Beattie of Everton and Steven Gerrard of Liverpool both wore the double-digit 08 instead of the single-digit 8 in the Merseyside derby on 25 March 2006, to commemorate the City of Liverpool becoming the European Capital of Culture for 2008.
Tugay Kerimoğlu wore the number 94 on his 94th and final cap for Turkey against Brazil in 2007.
Rubén Sosa wore number 100 for the 100th Anniversary of Nacional on 14 May 1999.
In 1999, Pablo Bengoechea wore number 108 for the 108th Anniversary of Peñarol.
During his record-breaking 618th game for São Paulo, Rogério Ceni wore number 618, the highest number ever worn in professional football until 2015.
During his last match, number 100, for the Danish national team, Martin Jørgensen wore shirt number 100.
During his record-breaking 100th cap for South Africa, Aaron Mokoena wore shirt number 100.
In 2011, Vasco da Gama's heroes Felipe and Juninho Pernambucano wore the number 300—in different matches—to celebrate their 300th matches for the club.
Vasco captain Juninho wore the number 114 against Clássico dos Gigantes rivals Fluminense for the 114th anniversary of the club in 2012.
 Goalkeeper Victor of Atlético Mineiro wore the 2019 shirt in July 2015 celebrating his contract renewal until 2019.
 In 2021, Chilean goalkeeper Claudio Bravo wore number 22 in a friendly match against Bolivia, as a tribute to former goalkeeper Mario Osbén, who died a few days before the match.

See also
 List of retired numbers in association football
 Number (sports)

References

Association football terminology
Football, Association